The Lone Wolf's Daughter is a surviving 1919 American silent era crime/drama/thriller motion picture starring Bertram Grassby, Louise Glaum, and Thomas Holding.

Directed by William P.S. Earle and produced by J. Parker Read, Jr., the screenplay and the intertitles were adapted by Louis Joseph Vance based on his novels about the Lone Wolf, a jewel thief turned private detective.

Filmed at Thomas H. Ince Studios in Culver City, The Lone Wolf's Daughter was billed as the sequel to The Lone Wolf (1917) and The False Faces (1919). The movie premiered in Chicago. It was not exhibited in Los Angeles until January 12, 1920.

Glaum was acknowledged as a fashion plate for "wearing at least fifty different and striking gowns."

Synopsis
The story is set in London, England. Princess Sonia (played by Glaum) and her husband, exiled Russian nobleman Prince Victor (played by Stevens), are at an auction. She is bidding against him in an effort to obtain a Corot landscape that has incriminating letters she wrote hidden inside. The painting is purchased by Michael Lanyard (played by Grassby), who is suspected of being the mysterious international thief the "Lone Wolf".

Lanyard gives the letters to Princess Sonia. She then divorces Prince Victor and marries Lanyard. With malevolent hatred, Victor threatens to follow Lanyard "to the very gates of Hell". Lanyard replies, "If you do, then I'll push you inside." Princess Sonia dies after giving birth to their daughter, Sonia. Lanyard is unaware that he has a daughter.

Years later, Sonia  (also played by Glaum) has grown up not knowing of her parentage or past. She thinks she is the daughter of Princess Sonia's maid. Sonia is found by Prince Victor, who is now the leader of an underworld gang of Oriental criminals and Bolsheviks. Telling her that he is her father, he brings her to his home in the hope it will entice Lanyard to make an appearance. She falls in love with Roger Karslake (played by Holding), who is Victor's secretary.

When Sonia learns of the gang's diabolical plan to have poisonous gas pumped into the Houses of Parliament, the homes of Downing Street and of the nobility, even Buckingham Palace, in order to clear the way for Victor to become England's dictator, she tells Karslake.

Unbeknownst to Sonia or the gang, Lanyard has actually been working in the household, posing as Victor's Oriental butler, and he and Karslake are both Scotland Yard agents. Lanyard learns that she is, in fact, his daughter. Following Sonia's recognition of her father, the Lone Wolf, he and Karslake capture the gang amidst a blazing house fire and a huge fight. Victor makes his way to the roof pursued by Lanyard, who shoves the evil prince down into the flames.

Cast
Bertram Grassby as Michael Lanyard, the Lone Wolf
Louise Glaum as Princess Sonia and as her daughter, Sonia
Edwin Stevens as Prince Victor
Thomas Holding as Roger Karslake
Fred L. Wilson (Undetermined role)
Wallace Beery (Undetermined role) (uncredited)

Reviews
A Los Angeles Times review of Saturday, January 11, 1920, reads:"Louise Glaum's now starring feature, "The Lone Wolf's Daughter," comes to Tally's Broadway Theater, tomorrow, Louis Joseph Vance was the author of the original story and J. Parker Read, Jr., the producer. The supporting cast is notable, including Edwin Stevens, Thomas Holding, Bertram Grassby, and many others. The scene of the story is London with a panorama of coloring, ranging from the magnificence of Buckingham Palace to the mysterious depths of the shadowy Limehouse district. The author personally arranged the scenario for Mr. Read, the producer. Much of the action takes place in Soho, the French quarter of London, where Sonia (Louise Glaum) who knows nothing of her parentage or past, is the attraction for the curious slumming parties. The plot centers about Sonia's captivity in the house of a celebrated crook, her discovery of mysterious maneuverings to poison all London, and the intense climax which follows directly after her recognition of her father, "The Lone Wolf", who has been working, unknown to her or by her, in the same household. In the play Miss Glaum incidentally reveals her talents as a fashion plate, wearing at least fifty different and striking gowns."

See also
List of American films of 1919

References

External links

The Lone Wolf's Daughter at the AFI Catalog of Feature Films
Film stills at silenthollywood.com

1919 films
American crime drama films
American thriller films
American silent feature films
American black-and-white films
1919 crime drama films
Films directed by William P. S. Earle
Pathé Exchange films
Films distributed by W. W. Hodkinson Corporation
The Lone Wolf films
1910s American films
Silent American drama films
Silent thriller films